Avara is a 1996 first-person shooter written by Juri Munkki for Macintosh and published by Ambrosia Software. A fast 3D engine, integrated Internet play, and easy level editing were notable features at the time of its release. While not commercially successful, the game found a cult following. Munkki publicly released the source code in 2016, the game's 20th anniversary.

Gameplay
Players operated a remote-controlled bipedal robot known as a Hostile Environment Combat and Tactical Operations Remote, or HECTOR. Larger models could hold more weaponry, useful in the game's primary mode as a shooter, but were less maneuverable in combat. The name HECTOR represents a thinly-guised tribute to Hector D. Byrd, Ambrosia's mascot, a female grey parrot.

Flying scout units controlled by each player provided an aerial view of the action, but were defenseless and could be destroyed by enemies or other HECTORs. Up to 6 players could join a game at once, either free-for-all, or in arbitrary teams which were chosen by color. Team color choice also affected the in-game HECTOR model's appearance. During games, players could communicate using an integrated text-based chat system.

Level maps for the engine's fully 3D world could be created using user-friendly, vector-based drawing programs such as ClarisWorks, ClarisDraw, or ShareDraw. Avara was bundled with some of these level packs, both for solo play and multiplayer modes, and fan-created packs were available for download from Ambrosia's website.

Development
Juri Munkki, the designer of Avara, had been interested in 3D graphics since the release of Apple II, however, the computer lacked the processing power required for his ideas.  Upon the release of Hellcats, Munkki realised that fast polygon rendering was possible on Mac II. For the second time, Munkki attempted writing his own polygon rendering library in late 1992 and successfully created an early version of the rendering used in Avara. 

Although Munkki was working on 3D wireframe graphics at the time, this animation library was strictly 2D. Munkki used this polygon library to write a unique sprite animation, in which sprites were polygons able to transform (scale, rotate, distort) freely.

In May 1994, Munkki attended Apple's Worldwide Developers Conference for the first time. Due to the fast speed objects were moving up and down the screen, people tended to incorrectly assume he was using very fast 3D graphics. Munkki wished to show his technology to a "gaming evangelist", and was readying demos on a PowerBook in the main hall of the San Jose Convention Centre. He never met the games evangelist as they never arrived at the meeting.Stuart Cheshire (the author of Bolo for Macintosh) was sitting behind Munkki as he was readying his demos and told him he would like to see a real 3D version of his technology to use in a 3D version of Bolo. Munkki said he would keep in touch if anything came from the 2D polygon work. 

Munkki met with Christian Fanz who was working on an Elite style game for Macintosh. Fanz was having difficulty making his 3D graphics fast enough for release. Following the advice of Cheshire, Munkki attempted to implement a BSP library.

Both Cheshire and Fanz were impressed with the demo. Munkki wrote a few demos to show how the library was used, using spaceship models as samples. One of the demos allowed the player to drive around scenery. The idea of this was to verify that the objects were being sorted into correct visual order. Avara was created using the concept of this experimental stress test.

Munkki wanted to create a battlezone style game, where a turret could move freely. He spent a few weeks before Christmas writing a simple networked game/demo which involved tanks with freely moving turrets. Munkki believed that it could be fun to allow the game to evolve by letting other shareware/freeware authors work on it, so he posted an article on comp.sys.mac.games inviting others to develop the game however they wanted. Andrew Welch, the president of Ambrosia software saw this article, leading to Avara becoming an Ambrosia title.

The walking robot (H.E.C.T.O.R) originally didn't have a name and its ability to jump was only written when Munkki believed the game was ready for public release, aside from still requiring levels to play with. The idea of the walking and jumping robot slightly predates the engine. In addition to the walking animation code from 1992, Munkki had early sketches of H.E.C.T.O.R jumping, however, he didn't originally intend the function to be in the game. 

Welch frequently played Cheshire's Bolo, and insisted on Avara having internet play, however Munkki didn't think the program architecture and game were suitable for internet play. Despite this, in January 1996 he attempted to make Avara suitable for internet play, writing code that "kinda" worked.. Encouraged by this success, Munkki continued developing the internet code until he could play Avara from Finland to the USA (modem to modem).

Welch and Munkki created multiple interesting levels together and released Avara 1.0.0.

Munkki frequently played Avara in its first weeks of release, however, he had to change ISP's (for reasons unrelated to Avara) at the time. The connections from this new ISP were inadequate to play Avara. After two years of playing Avara every day, Munkki was unsurprising tired of the game.

Reception
Avara was a commercial flop. At the time, it was Ambrosia's poorest selling game next to Chiral.

Legacy
In 2017, Munkki posted the source to his GitHub account, under the MIT software license. In September 2018, a fan-made port of Avara was posted on GitHub. It supports recent versions of Windows, Mac OS, and Linux.

References

External links
Juri Munkki (Designer's website)

1996 video games
Classic Mac OS games
Classic Mac OS-only games
Ambrosia Software games
Multiplayer online games
Multiplayer and single-player video games
First-person shooters
Commercial video games with freely available source code
Open-source video games
Software using the MIT license